The United Bangsamoro Justice Party (UBJP) is a political party based in Mindanao, Philippines, which is affiliated with the Moro Islamic Liberation Front (MILF).

Yasser Ebrahim and Naguib Sinarimbo are the president and general-secretary of the party respectively.

History

Formation
The United Bangsamoro Justice Party was organized in 2014 by the Moro Islamic Liberation Front (MILF) as a vehicle to run in future elections. The MILF, a rebel group which has been fighting for self-determination of the Moros in Mindanao, was anticipating the creation of a Bangsamoro autonomous region by 2016, after securing a peace deal with the Philippine government. The political party has formally been registered in May 2015 with the Commission on Elections (Comelec). The formation of the Bangsamoro region was delayed.

2019 Bangsamoro plebiscite
In October 2018, the party announced its intention to campaign for the "yes" vote at the Bangsamoro Autonomous Region creation plebiscite to be held in January and February 2019 and decided not to participate in the May 2019 local elections, even though some members decided to participate as independents or under major parties like the NUP, Lakas and PDP-Laban.

2022 Philippine elections
The UBJP fielded candidates for local positions to be contested in the 2022 Philippine elections. The party selected candidates who supported the Bangsamoro cause and the MILF-led Bangsamoro's government campaign to extend the transitional period of the region.

In April 2021, incumbent elected officials of the province of Tawi-Tawi joined the UBJP. They were joined by 11 Maguindanao mayors the following month marking the first batches of officials joining the UBJP.

The UBJP endorsed Esmael Mangudadatu and Bai Sandra Sema as candidates for governor and vice governor of Maguindanao for the 2022 elections.

While Chief Minister Murad Ebrahim tagged presidential candidate Isko Moreno as the "incoming president" during a courtesy call during the campaign period,on February 22 the UBJP released a clarification that it is not formally endorsing any candidate.

In April 2022, the UBJP along with Mangudadatu, eventually threw their support for Vice President Leni Robredo for president, with Bangsamoro Interim Chief Minister Murad Ebrahim stating that Robredo and the party are "overwhelmingly compatible" in terms of values and principles in relation to the Bangsamoro."

See also
Bangsamoro Party

References

Islamic democracy
Politics of Basilan
Politics of Lanao del Sur
Politics of Maguindanao del Norte
Politics of Maguindanao del Sur
Politics of Sulu
Politics of Tawi-Tawi
Regionalist parties in the Philippines
Moro Islamic Liberation Front